Christina Grima (born 8 February 1989) is a Maltese female professional basketball player.

External links
Profile at eurobasket.com

1989 births
Living people
People from Pietà, Malta
Maltese women's basketball players
Small forwards